The Rattlesnake Hills AVA is an American Viticultural Area located in Yakima County, Washington. United States Alcohol and Tobacco Tax and Trade Bureau (TTB) awarded Rattlesnake Hills its appellation status on March 20, 2006, making Rattlesnake Hills Washington's ninth federally recognized American Viticultural Area. The Rattlesnake Hills AVA is entirely contained within the Yakima Valley AVA, which is in turn is entirely contained within the larger Columbia Valley AVA. The hills form the northern boundary of Yakima Valley, and the AVA includes land between the north bank of the Sunnyside Canal and the entirety of the southern slopes of the Rattlesnake Hills between Outlook and the Wapato Dam. The AVA is centered on the city of Zillah.

Vineyards 

Vineyards in Rattlesnake Hills AVA include the Morrison Vineyard, planted in 1968 to Riesling and Cabernet Sauvignon for Chateau Ste. Michelle. It is the oldest vineyard in the AVA. In the late 1970s and early 1980s, the Hyatt Vineyard, Whisky Canyon, Outlook, and the Portteus Vineyard were also planted.

Opposition to AVA
When an AVA designation for the Rattlesnake Hills was proposed it created controversy among some Washington winemakers and vineyard growers. One of its most notable opponents was grower Dick Boushey of Boushey Vineyards in the Rattlesnake Hills (but not within the boundaries of the AVA). Boushey argued that the area did not have distinctive terroir that would merit an AVA stating "I know of no regional style, specific variety or type of wine that is unique to this proposed area. The granting of this proposal would confuse consumers and undermine the existing Yakima Valley Appellation."

See also 
Washington wine

References 

American Viticultural Areas
Washington (state) wine
Geography of Yakima County, Washington
2006 establishments in Washington (state)